The pyramid of Djedkare Isesi (in ancient Egyptian Nfr Ḏd-kꜣ-rꜥ ("Beautiful is Djedkare")) is a late 25th to mid 24th century BC pyramid complex built for the Fifth Dynasty pharaoh Djedkare Isesi. The pyramid is referred to as Haram el-Shawaf by locals. It was the first pyramid to be built in South Saqqara.

Djedkare Isesi's monument complex encompasses: a main pyramid; a mortuary temple situated on the east face of the main pyramid; a valley temple buried under modern Saqqara; a causeway that has been only partially dug out; and a cult pyramid. The basic dimensions of Djedkare's pyramid were adopted by succeeding kings in their own funerary monuments. Inside Djedkare Isesi's pyramid substructure, remains of the burial have been found alongside the mummy remains of Djedkare Isesi himself. The mummy and linen wrapping have undergone radiocarbon dating which have given a common range of 2886–2507 BC. The substructure has otherwise been badly damaged by stone thieves quarrying the Tura limestone casing.

Adjoining the pyramid's east face is the mortuary temple. Flanking the entrance hall to the temple are two large pylon structures. West of the south pylon, a large building with multiple long narrow rooms was discovered. The outline of the building has been preserved by foundational blocks, but its structure is otherwise poorly preserved, and its floor has been lost, possibly to stone thieves. The building has no contemporaries at other Old Kingdom pyramid complexes, and no companion on the north side. Its function is unknown. The mortuary temple was mostly destroyed during the Second Intermediate Period, and used as a burial site in the Eighteenth Dynasty. At the south-east corner of the pyramid, a small cult pyramid is found in an enclosure. It has a T-shaped substructure.

At the north-east corner of the pyramid complex's enclosure wall, a satellite pyramid complex belonging to Queen Setibhor was built. The sub-complex is the largest one built for a queen during the Old Kingdom. It has its own enclosure wall, a mortuary temple and offering hall, storage rooms, antichambre carrée of unparalleled size, a small cult pyramid, and otherwise incorporates features that were previously reserved exclusively for the complexes of the king.

Location and excavation 

The last kings of the Fifth Dynasty moved their funerary building activities from Abusir back to Saqqara. Djedkare Isesi built his pyramid  from the Abusir necropolis at a site in South Saqqara. It was the first pyramid to be built in that area. He also abandoned the tradition of building sun temples, indicating a shift in the religious significance from the cult of Ra to the cult of Osiris.

The pyramid was briefly visited by John Shae Perring, and soon after that by Karl Richard Lepsius. The substructure of the pyramid was first explored in 1880 by Gaston Maspero. In the mid-1940s, Alexandŕe Varille and Abdel Salam Hussein attempted the first comprehensive examination of the pyramid, but their work was interrupted and their findings lost. They did discover the skeletal remains of Djedkare Isesi in the pyramid. Ahmed Fakhry's attempt at a comprehensive examination in the 1950s was equally unsuccessful. Relief fragments that Fakhry had discovered were later published by Muhammud Mursi. The area around the causeway and mortuary temple was excavated by Mahmud Abdel Razek.

Architectural plans of the pyramid complex were first published by Vito Maragioglio and Celeste Rinaldi between 1962 and 1977. These have been determined by Mohamed Megahed, Peter Jánosi and Hana Vymazalová to be inconsistent and inaccurate. Since 2010, Megahed has been the director in charge of the pyramids of Djedkare Isesi and Setibhor.

Mortuary complex

Layout 
Old Kingdom mortuary complexes consisted of five essential components: (1) a valley temple; (2) a causeway; (3) a pyramid, or mortuary, temple; (4) a cult, or satellite, pyramid; and (5) the main pyramid. Djedkare's monument has all of these elements. The main pyramid constructed from six steps of limestone blocks. A valley temple, buried under the modern houses of Saqqara. A causeway, that has not yet been excavated. A mortuary temple on the east side of the pyramid, and a cult pyramid at the south-east corner of the main pyramid, with a standard T-shaped substructure. Additionally, there is an associated pyramid situated on the north-east corner of Djedkare's pyramid complex, belonging to Setibhor, previously known as the "pyramid of the unknown queen".

Main pyramid 
The core of the pyramid was constructed in six steps composed of small irregular pieces of limestone blocks bound together using clay mortar. These proportions were used by the rulers Teti, Pepi I, Merenre I, and Pepi II for their pyramid complexes. The pyramid was originally encased with fine white Tura limestone. Most of the casing has since been plundered, though some of it has remained intact and has been well preserved.

Substructure 

Entry into the substructure was gained from the north side of the pyramid; unusually, however, the entrance is under the pavement of the courtyard, instead of in the north face. There was originally a north chapel here; only traces of it now remain. The entry leads into a granite-lined downward-sloping access corridor. The corridor has a slight angle toward the east, and is the last built to do so. The corridor ends at a vestibule, through which a second corridor lined with limestone, the horizontal passage, is accessed. Remnants of broken vessels were discovered in the vestibule, suggesting that certain burial rituals had been performed there. The horizontal passage was guarded by three granite portcullises near the beginning of the corridor, and a fourth granite portcullis near its end. To east was a room, the serdab, containing three niches for storage, a developing feature of pyramids of the era. Fragments of the sarcophagus were found in a  depression in the floor. The roof of both the antechamber and burial chamber were constructed from two, or perhaps three, layers of gabled limestone blocks, in the same fashion as the pyramids in Abusir.

The rooms of the substructure have been badly damaged by stone thieves, who quarried the Tura limestone walls of the chambers, which has made reconstruction of the planned layout difficult. The serdab was left alone, preserving its structure and flat roof. The masonry core has been exposed in the other chambers, and consists of crudely cut blocks and small limestone chips that were piled up to form the substructure of the pyramid. The wall separating the antechamber and burial chamber has been total demolished. The substructure has been subject to significant on-going restoration work, particularly the consolidation of the pyramid's core and the walls of the antechamber and serdab.

Djedkare's sarcophagus originally sat near the west wall of the burial chamber. At the south-east foot of the sarcophagus, alabaster canopic jars had once buried in a small hole in the ground. Underneath the rubble, only fragments of the sarcophagus and alabaster jars have been found, along with a mummified body of a man in his fifties that is presumed to be the remains of Djedkare Isesi. The mummy has been subjected to Carbon-14 dating, as have scraps of linen wrapping and charcoal taken from the tomb. These samples have provided a range of dates spanning 3340–2460 BC, and a common range of 2886–2507 BC. Miroslav Verner remarks that these results accord better with earlier proposed regnal dates than later ones, but contradicts previous astronomically derived dates which favour later proposed regnal dates than earlier ones.

Valley temple 
The valley temple to Djedkare's complex has not been excavated. It is lost buried under the modern houses of Saqqara.

Causeway 

The causeway that leads up to the mortuary temple has not been excavated. The ground where the mortuary temple was constructed sloped sharply down towards the desert needing extensive preparation before the laying of the foundation. Dimensions for the causeway are speculative, based only on the trace remains of existing foundations. Its height remains unknown, though it is clear that it was covered based on blocks found painted with stars, a typical motif for the ceiling. It appears to have been made entirely of white limestone, the same material that makes up the causeway to Sahure's pyramid, with walls decorated with raised relief. The causeway connects to the temple entrance hall between two large pylon structures, an innovation from Nyuserre's pyramid, which were square with slightly inclined walls. Stairs may have led to the terrace, but likely had no rooms inside. Their function is unclear. A water drain made of crudely cut and carelessly set quartzite blocks was discovered running alongside the causeway.

Mortuary temple

Outer temple 
The entrance hall of the temple had an alabaster paved floor and likely a vaulted ceiling as indicated by the size of the walls. It terminates into an open courtyard paved with alabaster and adorned with sixteen pink granite palmiform columns. As in Sahure's mortuary temple, the columns bore the names and titles of the complexes' owner, Djedkare Isesi. It supported an ambulatory whose ceiling was decorated with stars. Stone thieves have damaged or removed the columns, walls and pavement of the room. The courtyard also once had a water drain built of red quartzite running along its axis and a relief decorated alabaster altar.

Flanking the entrance hall are twelve storage rooms that are accessed from the transverse corridor. A pair of corridors separated by a doorway lead to the southern storage rooms. The western corridor is poorly preserved; the eastern corridor is in better condition. The corridor was built of limestone, though only the paved floor has been preserved. The storage rooms north of the entrance hall are similar in size, but are in far worse condition.

Inner temple 
The courtyard connects to the transverse corridor, which has a low staircase in its west wall leading into the inner temple. The chambers of the inner temple were originally paved with alabaster, but only the limestone paved storage rooms have any original floor remaining.

A small passage led inside to the chapel with its five statue niches, followed by a vestibule to a small square room with a single granite column at its centre  the antichambre carée  before terminating at the offering hall. The chapel has disintegrated, its dimensions are indeterminable, as are the dimensions of the red granite lined statue niches. This room connected to the antichamber carrée, but also to a series of rooms further south.

Its north, east, and part of the south walls are lost. Its central column supported the room's ceiling, and bore the names and titles of Djedkare Isesi, as well as an image of Nekhbet, the goddess of Upper Egypt. Some previously discovered relief fragments may have come from this room. They depict scenes of deities possessing Was-sceptres and ankh symbols, shrines of Upper and Lower Egypt, acts of slaughter, and bowing officials.

There was once a red granite doorway on the north wall of the antechamber that allowed access into the offering hall. The offering hall of the temple is similar to other contemporary offering halls in other complexes, with the exception that the false door was carved into the masonry of the pyramid. The ceiling, of which little remains, was painted dark blue and decorated with yellow stars. It can be inferred from contemporary sources that the hall contained an alabaster altar and table, a basin and a drainage system. Though nothing, except a few scraps of alabaster that may belong to the altar, of these installations remains.

Surrounding the inner temple were storage rooms on either side. The southern storage rooms were accessed from the vestibule. Most notably, these storage rooms extend into the main pyramid. The northern storage rooms were divided into rows. The eastern row was accessed from the statue chapel, the western rows were accessed from the offering hall. They were not interconnected. The layout of these rooms appears to be particular to this temple. As in the southern storage rooms, the westernmost row of the northern storage rooms extended into the pyramid. It is unclear whether the storage rooms of the temple were two stories high, as attested in other mortuary temples, as the walls are poorly preserved.

Archaeological findings 
The temple was mostly destroyed during the Second Intermediate Period, and was used as a burial site in the Eighteenth Dynasty. Relief decoration is fragmentary, as extensive damage was done to the walls of the temple by stone thieves. The remnants indicate that the quality of execution both in design and workmanship is comparable to other contemporary works.

Four Djed pillars, three of which were preserved, were recovered from the mortuary temple. Their smooth tops indicate that they may have held some artifact. Two similar, but smaller, pillars were found in Unas' mortuary temple.

Statues of a lion and two sphinxes have been found in the complex. It is postured into a seated position with paws extended. It is broken, but otherwise very well preserved. By contrast, the two sphinx statues are only partially preserved. They represent recumbent lions, but the faces of both sphinx statues have been damaged. They appear to decorated a wall or formed part of another feature as suggested by the fact that they rest on rectangular pedestals. Sphinx statues in the Old Kingdom are rare. A parallel exists in Unas' complex. A reference to Djedkare's sphinx exists in a biographical inscription of a Kaemtjenenet, who was responsible for organizing the placement of the sphinx and its base in the mortuary temple.

Limestone sculptures of kneeling captives have been found in the temple. These are common, and have been attested to in the temples of Neferefre, Nyuserre, Unas, Teti and Pepi I. The likely providence of these statues is the causeway or entrance hall of the temple, where scenes of enemies being trampled would typically be found. Fragments of an alabaster statue of Djedkare were found in the temple, one of which bears an inscription.

Cult pyramid 
The complex includes a typical cult pyramid at the south-east corner of the pyramid. The pyramid was constructed with a core three steps high. Entry into the substructure was gained through a door on the middle of its north face. The substructure had a standard T-shaped layout, consisting of a downward sloping corridor leading to a single rectangular chamber slightly beneath ground level which was oriented east-west. The cult pyramid was enclosed by a small perimeter wall.

The purpose of the cult pyramid remains unclear. It had a burial chamber but was not used for burials, and instead appears to have been a purely symbolic structure. It may have hosted the pharaoh's ka, or a miniature statue of the king. It may have been used for ritual performances centering around the burial and resurrection of the ka spirit during the Sed festival.

Other

Structure of unknown purpose 
South of the main mortuary temple was a large  by  building of unknown height. Blocks from the foundation of the building have been preserved, but no blocks from a potential floor have been found. It is possible that the floor has been victim to stone quarrying for calcite, as has happened elsewhere in the temple, but physical evidence suggests that a limestone floor is much more likely. In this case, quality limestone must have made up the floor of building. No doors or connecting passages have been found, rendering it difficult to identify the access point into the building. A corridor has been identified stretching from the south-west corner of the pylon, past the south side of the building, and to the enclosure wall of the cult pyramid, where it may have turned north to connect to the transverse corridor. A second potential corridor has been identified running along the east side of the building. It appears that this building was separate from its neighbouring counterparts. The structure is otherwise poorly preserved, and its purpose unknown. No similar structure has been located at other contemporary pyramid complexes of the Old Kingdom, and no companion building on the north side of the mortuary temple either.

Cemetery 
During 2018, a large area constrained between the northern pylon, the mortuary temple and enclosure wall, and Setibhor's pyramid complex was excavated. Clearing of the site revealed three layers of debris. The top layer consisted of windswept sand and limestone chips. The middle layer contained burials of limestone and ceramic coffins, and pottery. The bottom layer had two distinct sectors: west and east. The west sector most contained accumulated trash from the Old Kingdom and First Intermediate Period, including pottery, clay seals, and other small finds. There were few burials in this layer. The east sector contained burials and pottery from the Second Intermediate Period and New Kingdom. Beneath these layers of debris was the ground level. These contained the oldest burials in the area, estimated to date to the period of the funerary cult of Djedkare Isesi in the late Fifth Dynasty to the First Intermediate Period.

Pyramid of Setibhor 

A satellite pyramid complex is located at the north-east corner of the wall of the complex of Djedkare's pyramid. With the exception of a valley temple and causeway, the satellite pyramid has the standard elements that are typically found only in the king's pyramid. The complex is enclosed within its own perimeter wall and consists of: a pyramid; colonnaded court; statue chapel; a mortuary temple with its own offering hall, storage rooms, and antichambre carrée with single column; and a small cult pyramid. Its column and base appear to be both be made of limestone, instead of the typical granite. Relief fragments found on limestone blocks may also originate in the chamber. Due to its being intentionally incorporated into the pyramid complex of Djedkare Isesi, the pyramid is believed to have belonged to a consort of Djedkare Isesi. The identity of the owner remained a mystery until 2019, when Setibhor's name and titles were found inscribed on a column in the complex. Setibhor's pyramid complex is thus the largest one built for a queen in the Old Kingdom, and incorporates elements that were previously only used in the complexes of the king.

Later history

Burials 
In 1952, Fahkry explored a necropolis containing seventeen mudbrick tombs located south of the causeway and adjoining the east side of the mortuary temple. He provided a brief account summarizing that the tombs had been robbed of their contents. In 2016, one of those tombs, mastaba MS1, was partially excavated and explored. The structure is dated to the Sixth Dynasty. The tomb is also connected to another tomb further east.

The chamber and shaft are made of mudbrick. The tomb has been emptied, except for some human remains. The south burial chamber contained fragments of human remains. These too were constructed entirely from mudbrick. They are connected by a  vaulted passage. This chamber has been blocked with a wall. The south-east compartment contains a vaulted mudbrick burial chamber  by  large. It was included as an apparent afterthought. Remains of multiple individuals were found in the chamber, but their origin is unclear. Other items recovered included faience beads and a seal stamp with a seated lion facing a crouching enemy. This type of seal can be dated to the Sixth Dynasty or the First Intermediate Period.

The north-east compartment is the largest and most significant of the tomb. It is accessed by a  shaft. The ceiling of the limestone burial chamber was painted black and red to imitate red granite. Its side walls were decoratively painted with scenes of offerings and a palace façade motif, and have been well preserved, except for at its southern section. Lines of inscription above the decorations identify the owner of the burial: Pepyankh Setju. Above the burial chamber, in the space with the vaulted mudbrick ceiling, an offering table bearing the name Isesi was found.

See also 
 Egyptian pyramid construction techniques
 List of Egyptian pyramids
 List of megalithic sites

Notes

References

Sources

Further reading
 Maragioglio, Vito, and Celeste Rinaldi. Notizie sulle piramidi di Zedefrâ, Zedkarâ Isesi, Teti. Turin: Tip. Artale, 1962.
 Maragioglio, Vito, and Celeste Rinaldi. L'Architettura delle piramidi Menfite, parte VIII: la piramide de Neuserrâ, la "small pyramid" di Abu Sir, la "piramide distrutta" di Saqqara ed il complesso di Zedkarâ Isesi e della sua regina. Translated by A. E. Howell. Rapallo: Officine Grafiche Canessa, 1977.
 Megahed, Mohamed. "The Pyramid Complex of Djedkare-Isesi at South Saqqara and its Decorative Program." Doctor of Philosophy, Charles University, 2016.
 Stadelmann, Rainer. Die ägyptischen Pyramiden: vom Ziegelbau zum Weltwunder. KAW 30. Mainz am Rhein: Philipp von Zabern, 1985.
 Verner, Miroslav. Forgotten Pharaohs, Lost Pyramids. Translated by Anna Bryson and Jana Klepetářová. Prague: Academia Škodaexport, 1994.

External links 

 Haram el-Shawaf
 The Pyramid of Djedkare at southern South Saqqara In Egypt

1880 archaeological discoveries
3rd-millennium BC establishments in Egypt
Buildings and structures completed in the 24th century BC
Djedkare Isesi
Pyramids of the Fifth Dynasty of Egypt
Saqqara